Francis "Frank" Frederick Burdett Wittenoom (17 December 185511 September 1939) was an explorer and pastoralist in Western Australia.

Biography

Early life
Frank Wittenoom was born in York, Western Australia in 1855. He was the grandson of John Burdett Wittenoom, one of the first chaplains in the Swan River Colony. His brother was Sir Edward Charles (Horne) Wittenoom, a member of the Western Australian Legislative Council for 34 years.

Career
He took up farming in Western Australia. Additionally, he was the first European to explore much of the Murchison, Gascoyne and Pilbara areas of the north-west of Western Australia.

He built a Queen Anne style house in Perth, called "The Terraces", in the late 1890s and extended it in 1900. In 1987, the house was classified by the National Trust of Australia and has been added to the State Register of Heritage Places.

Death and legacy
Wittenoom never married. He died in Perth, Western Australia, aged 83. The former town of Wittenoom, Western Australia, was named after him by Lang Hancock, with whom he shared a nearby pastoral lease.

References

External links
Varied and versatile at www.hesperianpress.com

Explorers of Western Australia
1855 births
1939 deaths
Burials at East Perth Cemeteries
People from York, Western Australia